...warning: r. stevie moore... is the ninth 12" vinyl record album by DIY home recording pioneer and one-man band R. Stevie Moore. It was the last of four RSM albums released by New Rose Records in Paris, France. Most of the disc's material resulted from studio sessions for the previous album, Teenage Spectacular. Never officially reissued on compact disc, the expanded CD-R version is available by mail from the artist.

Track listing

Side one
 "Manufacturers" (5:26) 
 "It's What You Do (It's Not What You Are)" (4:16) 
 "Alecia" (5:37)
 "You Always Want What You Don't Have" (3:56)

Side two
 "Jailbait" (Williams) (3:41) 
 "The Whereabouts" (3:35) 
 "Diary" (Gates) (3:23) 
 "Thinking" (5:12) 
 "Getting Better" (John Lennon, Paul McCartney) (2:54)
CDR Bonus Tracks: 
 "Melbourne" (3:18) 
 "Melbourne" [Factory Mix] (3:17) 
 "Rock 'N' Roll Kit" (3:01) 
 "I'm Only Sleeping" (Lennon, McCartney) (3:03) 
 "And Your Bird Can Sing" (Lennon, McCartney) (2:03) 
 "And Your Bird Can Play" (Lennon, McCartney) (2:03) 
 "Time of the Season" (Rod Argent) (4:39)

External links
 RSM's Warning webpage

1988 albums
R. Stevie Moore albums
New Weird America albums